National Trust properties in Northern Ireland is a list of National Trust properties in Northern Ireland.

County Antrim
Carrick-a-Rede Rope Bridge
The Crown Liquor Saloon
Divis and Black Mountain, Belfast
Dunseverick Castle
Fair Head Coastal Nature Reserve
Giant's Causeway
Patterson's Spade Mill

County Armagh
Ardress House
Coney Island, Lough Neagh
Derrymore House

County Down
Castle Ward
Mount Stewart
Murlough Nature Reserve
Rowallane Garden

County Fermanagh
Castle Coole
Crom Estate
Florence Court

County Londonderry
Downhill Estate and Mussenden Temple
Hezlett House
Springhill
Portstewart Strand

County Tyrone
Gray's Printing Press, Strabane
Wellbrook Beetling Mill, Cookstown

See also
List of National Trust properties in England
List of National Trust properties in Wales
List of National Trust for Scotland properties
An Taisce The National Trust for the Republic of Ireland (including list of properties)

External links
 The National Trust

 
National Trust properties in Northern Ireland
Tourism in Northern Ireland
Conservation in Northern Ireland